Michel Trollé (born 23 June 1959) is a French former racing driver from Lens, Pas-de-Calais.

He began his career in Championnat de France Formule Renault Turbo in 1984, finishing second in the championship.

In 1985 he moved to the French Formula Three Championship and finished third in points with two wins.

In 1986 he participated in a handful of major Formula Three races including the Macau Grand Prix and participated in one World Sports-Prototype Championship race in a Porsche 962C for John Fitzpatrick Racing.

In 1987 he made his International Formula 3000 debut and finished second in his first race and won the third race of the season at Circuit de Spa-Francorchamps. Trollé finished sixth in the championship.

He returned to the series in 1988 but his season was curtailed after a serious accident at Brands Hatch. However, he still finished 11th in points on the strength of two podium finishes in the first six races.

Trollé was regarded as one of the best of a promising crop of French drivers and had held discussions with both Larrousse and Tyrrell for an F1 seat in 1989. He was due to sign a provisional agreement with Tyrrell at the Belgian Grand Prix, to be held the weekend after the Brands Hatch Formula 3000 race.

In 1990 he moved to sports cars part-time and participated in World Sports-Prototype Championship for Courage Compétition and made his 24 Hours of Le Mans debut with the team, finishing 7th overall.

He returned to Courage in the Sportscar World Championship in 1991 for 3 races in what would be his last professional racing starts.

24 Hours of Le Mans results

References

1959 births
Living people
People from Lens, Pas-de-Calais
French racing drivers
French Formula Renault 2.0 drivers
French Formula Three Championship drivers
International Formula 3000 drivers
24 Hours of Le Mans drivers
World Sportscar Championship drivers
Sportspeople from Pas-de-Calais

Team LeMans drivers